The Athenaeum Music & Arts Library is a non-profit membership library located in La Jolla, in the city of San Diego, California. It was incorporated as the Library Association of La Jolla in 1899. It has a rich history, closely entwined with the history of the La Jolla community.

The history of the Athenaeum Music & Arts Library began in 1884, when a group of pioneer La Jolla women established the La Jolla Reading Club. By 1898, the "Reading Room" was constructed on the corner of Girard Avenue and Wall Street. Today the Athenaeum Music & Arts Library is a thriving cultural institution and one of only 16 membership libraries remaining in the U.S. The library welcomes 100,000 visitors a year and presents year-round concerts, lectures, and public programs in addition to fine art classes in various media. It houses a unique collection of art and music books, CDs, DVDs, and special collections, and is recognized especially for its collection of artists’ books.
The Athenaeum is housed in three historic buildings, which were joined and remodeled in 2006 following an ambitious capital campaign. In 2016, the Athenaeum Art Center opened in the Logan Heights neighborhood, featuring a print studio and an event space.

The library is open to the public five days a week: Tuesday through Saturday, from 10:30 a.m. to 5:30 p.m.

References

External links

The Athenaeum Music & Arts Library

 

Libraries in San Diego
La Jolla, San Diego
Buildings and structures in San Diego
Culture of San Diego
1899 establishments in California
Tourist attractions in San Diego